Wenonah may refer to:

Literature 
 Wenonah, Hiawatha's mother in Longfellow's 1855 poem The Song of Hiawatha

Places 
United States
 Wenonah, Alabama, a community of ore mining camps near Birmingham, Alabama 
 Wenonah, Illinois, a village 
 Wenonah, New Jersey, a borough
 Wenonah, Minneapolis, a neighborhood in Minneapolis, Minnesota
 Wenonah Lodge, an Adirondack great camp on Upper Saranac Lake built for Jules Bache about 1915

Schools 
United States
 Wenonah School District, in Wenonah, New Jersey
 Wenonah Elementary School, an elementary school in the Sachem School District on Long Island in New York
 Wenonah High School, in Birmingham, Alabama

Vessels 
 USS Wenonah (SP-165), a yacht acquired by the U.S. Navy during World War I, also designated as USC&GS Wenonah and USS Wenonah (PY-11)
 USS Wenonah (YT-148), a harbor tugboat in service from World War II until 1974
 Wenonah (1866), a steamship that navigated lakes in Muskoka, Ontario, Canada
 Wenonah II, a replica steam vessel operating in Muskoka, Ontario

See also 
 Wenona (disambiguation)
 Winona (disambiguation)